"Tired of Toein' the Line" is a song by Rocky Burnette, who co-wrote it with Ron Coleman, former bass player of The Brothers Grim  and The Everly Brothers.

Background
The song was performed by Burnette, and contains lyrics detailing an imminent breakup from the point of view of a man who no longer wants to toe the line.

Chart performance
After first appearing on the UK Official Singles Chart Top 75 in November 1979, the song became an international hit after its release in the United States in May 1980, and was Burnette's only hit single.

By peaking at number eight on the Billboard Hot 100, "Tired of Toein' the Line" tied "You're Sixteen", by Rocky's father Johnny Burnette, as the highest-charting Hot 100 single from a member of the Burnette family. The single was number one in Australia (for two weeks) in June 1980.

Weekly charts

Year-end charts

Certifications

Cover versions
In the 1980s, cover versions of the song were released by Ricky Nelson on his album Playing to Win (1981), and British singer Shakin' Stevens on his album A Whole Lotta Shaky (1988).

See also
1980 in music
List of 1980s one-hit wonders in the United States
List of number-one singles in Australia during the 1980s

References

External links
 Lyrics of this song
 

1979 songs
1980 singles
Number-one singles in Australia
EMI America Records singles